Banchieri is a surname. Notable people with the surname include:

Adriano Banchieri (1568–1634), Italian composer, music theorist, organist, and poet
Antonio Banchieri (1667–1733), Italian cardinal
Mauricio Banchieri (born 1972), Chilean businessman and entrepreneur